Lac de Lessoc (or Lac de Montbovon) is a reservoir on the Saane/Sarine river between Lessoc and Montbovon in the  Canton of Fribourg, Switzerland. The Lessoc dam with a height of 33 m was completed in 1976.

External links
Swiss Dams: Lessoc

Reservoirs in Switzerland
Lakes of the canton of Fribourg